Gaeun is an eup in Mungyeong, Gyeongsangbuk-do, South Korea.  It was formerly a center of coal-mining, but the last mines closed in the 1990s.  The dominant local industries are now tourism and agriculture.  There are also several operating kilns.

Gaeun occupies an area of 152.4 km2, of which more than 80% is vacant land, largely rugged hill country.  These hills are home to a variety of wild animals including deer and wild boars.

The population numbers 5,594, of which about 60% are involved in farming.  Since it gained eup status in 1973, Gaeun has lost three quarters of its population.  Much of this is due to the loss of the mining industry.

The Gaeun Line railroad formerly connected the town with the Mungyeong Line, providing passenger and freight connections to the nationwide rail grid by way of Jeomchon.  The line is now abandoned.  City buses connect Gaeun to the nearby towns of Mungyeong-eup, Jeomchon, and Hamchang.  In addition, there are limited bus connections to Seoul.

Local attractions include the Gaeun Coal Museum, a monument to uibyeong general Yi Gang-nyeon, and the putative birthplace of the Hubaekje king Gyeon Hwon.  Anglers also visit the area in order to fish the Yeong River, which flows through the town on its way to the Jinnam Bridge area and the Nakdong River beyond.

See also
Geography of South Korea
Subdivisions of South Korea

External links
Gaeun-eup local government website, in Korean

Mungyeong
Towns and townships in North Gyeongsang Province